Black & White: The Dawn of Justice is a 2014 Chinese-Taiwanese 3D crime action film directed by Tsai Yueh-Hsun. It is a prequel to and based on the television series Black & White (2009), and a sequel to Black & White Episode I: The Dawn of Assault (2012).

The film stars Mark Chao, reprising his role from the previous film and television series, with Lin Gengxin, Huang Bo, and Janine Chang also starring.

Black & White: The Dawn of Justice was released on October 1, 2014 in China and on October 2, 2014 in Taiwan.

Premise 
Set after the events of Black & White Episode I: The Dawn of Assault, Wu Ying Xiong teams up with Chen Zhen, an officer from the Eastern District with a radically different style, to find and stop the bombers terrorizing Harbor City.

Cast
Mark Chao as Wu Ying Xiong
Lin Gengxin  as Chen Zhen
Huang Bo as Xu Da-Fu
Janine Chang as Lan Hsi-Ying
Shiou Chieh-kai as Huang Shih-Kai
Jason Tsou as Cheng Nuo
Terri Kwan as Du Xiao-Qing
Guli Nazha as Li Xiao-Mu
Chin Shih-Chieh as Shih Yung-Kuang
Moon Wang as Kuo Cheng-Ying
Tsai Yueh-Hsun as Lan C-En
Tang Chih-Wei as Chen Chun-Lin
Fion Hong as Ai Lv
Hank Wu as Hulk
Mandy Lieu as Ann
Christopher Lee as Pu Chih-Kang
Hu Ting-ting as Lo Yung-Chen
Chen Han-dian as drug addict (deleted scenes)

Reception
By October 7, the film had earned ¥159.69 million at the Chinese box office.

References

External links

2014 crime action films
2014 3D films
China Film Group Corporation films
Chinese 3D films
Chinese crime action films
Films based on television series
Hong Kong crime action films
Taiwanese 3D films
Taiwanese crime action films
Taiwanese sequel films
20th Century Fox films
2010s Hong Kong films